Woodlands Road was a tram stop on the Bury Line of the Metrolink system in the Cheetham Hill area of north Manchester, England. It opened in 1913 as a heavy rail station and closed for conversion to light rail in 1991, opening with the new Metrolink system in 1992.

Woodlands Road was the closest station to the Manchester Museum of Transport on Boyle Street. Two new stations opened nearby, ( and ), which led to the closure of the stop on 16 December 2013.

History

The original railway line was opened in 1879 by the Lancashire and Yorkshire Railway between Manchester Victoria and Bury.  Woodlands Road,  and  stations were added to the line in 1913, in an attempt to fend off growing electric tramway competition in the Cheetham Hill area. The original halt had wooden platforms. The site is near the vanished junction of a former branch line to the chemical works in Blackley.

Closure

The UK Government announced that £4 million from the Community Infrastructure Fund was awarded to two new stops on the Bury Metrolink line. This was part of £30 million allocated to transport projects to support thousands of extra homes being built across the country over the coming months. The Chairman of the Greater Manchester Integrated Transport Authority, Councillor Keith Whitmore, stated that the funding would help realise a long-held ambition to open new Metrolink stops in the area.

The two new stops were:
  (opened 2013), providing a closer stop to the Museum of Transport. The site is close to the Queens Road tram depot and there was a small tram halt there for Metrolink staff only, which was replaced by a full passenger station. The station opened on 16 December 2013.

These two new tram stops replaced Woodlands Road station, which was closed on 16 December 2013; the decision provoked some opposition from local residents who campaigned to retain the station.

Services
Woodlands Road was located on the Bury Line with trams towards Bury stopping every 6 minutes between 9:59am and 4pm, Mondays to Fridays. with no weekend or evening service. This was due to the opening of the nearby Abraham Moss Metrolink station further north along the Bury line.

Connecting bus routes
Woodlands Road was a Metrolink station that was not served by any bus service. The nearest bus services were the 151, 156 and 165 on Hazelbottom Road or Smedley Road and the 88, 89 and 135 on Cheetham Hill Road.

References

External links

Woodlands Road Stop Information
Woodlands Road area map

Disused Manchester Metrolink tram stops
Former Lancashire and Yorkshire Railway stations
Railway stations in Great Britain opened in 1913
Railway stations in Great Britain closed in 1991
Railway stations in Great Britain opened in 1992
Railway stations in Great Britain closed in 2013
1913 establishments in England